Semen Penchuk (born 17 January 2001) is a Belarusian footballer who plays for Minsk.

References

External links

2001 births
Living people
Belarusian footballers
Association football midfielders
FC Minsk players
Belarusian Premier League players